Shane Conway (born 26 October 1998) is an Irish hurler who plays for Kerry Senior Championship club Lixnaw and at inter-county level with the Kerry senior hurling team. He usually lines out as a forward.

Career

A member of the Lixnaw club, Conway first came to prominence at underage levels by winning minor and under-21 championship titles. He progressed onto the club's senior team and won a County Championship title in 2018. Conway subsequently lined out with University College Cork, winning consecutive Fitzgibbon Cup titles in 2019 and 2020. He first came to prominence on the inter-county scene as a member of the Kerry minor and under-21 teams that won All-Ireland titles in the respective second tier championships. He made his debut with the Kerry senior hurling team in 2018.

Career statistics

Honours

University College Cork
Fitzgibbon Cup: 2019, 2020

Lixnaw
Kerry Senior Hurling Championship: 2018
Kerry Under-21 hurling championship: 2016
Kerry Minor Hurling Championship: 2014, 2015

Kerry
All-Ireland Under-21 B Hurling Championship: 2017, 2018
All-Ireland Minor B Hurling Championship: 2015, 2016

Awards 
Bord Gáis Energy All-Ireland Under-21 B Hurler of the Year: 2017
Electric Ireland Higher Education GAA Rising Stars Hurling Team of the Year: 2019, 2020
GAA/GPA Joe McDonagh Cup Team of the Year: 2020, 2021
Fitzgibbon Cup Player of the year: 2019

References

1998 births
Living people
UCC hurlers
Lixnaw hurlers
Kerry inter-county hurlers